Cordia dodecandra (common name: ziricote) is a small tree in the borage family (Boraginaceae) native to southern Mexico, Central America, and the Caribbean.

Description
Flowers are produced in clusters at branch ends from February to May. Short stamens are intercalated between long ones, resulting in two levels of stamens. The species is heterostylous and has been shown to be self-incompatible. White fruits follow the flowers, averaging  in length. The fruits are locally made into sweets.

Uses

It is used for furniture, veneer, cabinetry, flooring, gun stocks, musical instruments (including guitars and ukuleles), entrance doors, turnings, decorative beams, trim, and small specialty items.

Gallery

References

dodecandra
Plants described in 1845
Flora of Mexico
Flora of Central America
Flora of the Caribbean
Flora without expected TNC conservation status